Win Moe Kyaw (born 9 October 1996), is a Burmese footballer currently playing as a defender.

Career statistics

International

References

1996 births
Living people
Burmese footballers
Myanmar international footballers
Association football defenders